Aileen de Graaf (born 25 April 1990) is a Dutch darts player playing in events of the World Darts Federation (WDF). She is member of the Dutch national team.
She also plays in events of the Professional Darts Corporation (PDC).

Career 

De Graaf started to play darts in 2007 and from 2010, played ranking tournaments of the NBD. Since 2012, she plays the BDO/WDF circuit and already won a lot of tournaments or at least reached the later rounds.
De Graaf qualified for the BDO World Championship 2014 but lost in the first round against the later champion Lisa Ashton.

World Championships results

BDO/WDF

Career finals

BDO majors (2 titles, 4 runners-up)

Performance timeline

References 
Notes

Sources

External links 
 Dartsdatabase profile

1990 births
Living people
British Darts Organisation players
Dutch darts players
People from Spakenburg
Professional Darts Corporation women's players
Sportspeople from Utrecht (province)